The Khangiran gas field is an Iranian natural gas field that was discovered in 1967. It began production in 1980 and produces natural gas and condensates. The total proven reserves of the Khangiran gas field are around 17 trillion cubic feet (480×109m3) and production is slated to be around 600 million cubic feet/day (17×106m3).

References

Natural gas fields in Iran